The Newcastle City Hall (currently known as O2 City Hall Newcastle for sponsorship reasons) is a concert hall located in Newcastle upon Tyne, England. It has hosted many popular music and classical artists throughout the years, as well as standup and comedy acts. The venue is operated by Academy Music Group and named under a group sponsorship agreement with telecoms company O2. It is a Grade II listed building.

History 
The building was designed by Nicholas & Dixon-Spain and opened in 1927 as a part of a development which also included the adjacent Newcastle City Baths. It has since become a venue for orchestras, rock and pop bands, and comedy acts, as well as for celebrity recitals, talks and civic functions. The city hall formed the east side of the complex and, like the city baths, the design involved a tall portico with central Doric order columns between flanking antae with five square windows above.

In November 2012, Newcastle City Council announced that, as part of a wider cost-cutting process, the future of the City Hall and the adjacent City Pool was under review, with a number of options being considered including closure or handing over the venue to an external operator. Council leader Nick Forbes pre-empted the outcome of the consultations process by stating that the City Hall has "No long-term future". In response, a 13,000 name petition against closure was presented to Newcastle City Council by members of the Facebook "North East Music History Group" on 31 January 2013.

In April 2016 it was announced that the Theatre Royal Trust had taken over management of the venue and, in May 2019, the Theatre Royal Trust transferred the City Hall operations to Academy Music Group, who operate the nearby O2 Academy Newcastle, and the venue was renamed as O2 City Hall Newcastle.

Organ
An organ, design and built by Harrison and Harrison was installed in 1928, to enable the building to operate as the city's first dedicated concert venue. A concert instrument, as opposed to a cathedral specification, it has been used for choral and orchestral concerts as well as organ recitals. It has 4,274 pipes, with a number of unique stops and has been described as "A Rolls-Royce" of organs.

The organ is currently in a poor state of repair, although as a result of its neglect, the instrument is probably the last and largest example of a Harrison tubular-pneumatic action (most other large organs were converted to electro-pneumatic action after World War II). The organ is also unusual in that it is unaltered, as most comparable organs have been modified, added-to or revoiced.

The British Institute of Organ Studies awarded it a Grade 1 Historic Organ Certificate in 2003, and the significance of the organ was taken into account as part of the assessment of the hall's Grade II listed building status.

Noted musical acts
The local rhythm and blues band, The Animals, reunited and performed for a one-off performance at the City Hall in 1968.

On 7 May 1971, American country rock band The Byrds performed there as part of their 1971 UK Tour and, in December 1976, as a one-off gig, local folk rock band, Lindisfarne, played three sell-out concerts in the City Hall.

Rock group, Emerson, Lake & Palmer, recorded their live album, Pictures at an Exhibition, there on 26 March 1971: Keith Emerson played the whole first Promenade on the City Hall organ.

The singer-songwriter, David Bowie, performed in the City Hall in January 1973 during his Ziggy Stardust Tour and the rock band, Wishbone Ash, recorded tracks at the City Hall for the live album Live Dates in June 1973. Meanwhile, the rock band, Roxy Music, recorded tracks for Viva Roxy Music at the City Hall in October 1974.

In 1981, rock band, Motörhead, recorded the majority of the tracks for their live album, No Sleep 'til Hammersmith, at the City Hall. Later that year, rock band, Slade, performed and recorded their show, which was later released as a live album, entitled Slade on Stage.

The German rock band, Rammstein, played at the city hall in October 1997 and Ray Jackson performed with a new lineup of Lindisfarne in December 2013.

See also
List of concert halls

References

External links 
 

Music venues in Tyne and Wear
Culture in Newcastle upon Tyne
Music venues completed in 1927
City Hall Newcastle
Grade II listed buildings in Tyne and Wear